The North Ringwood Football Club is an Australian rules football club located in North Ringwood, Victoria. They play in Division 1 of the Eastern Football League.

History
The Ringwood Catholic Rovers Football Club was founded in 1962. The club was a founding club of Eastern District Football League.

In December 1964 the club change its name to Ringwood Rovers Football Club then again in September 1966 to North Ringwood Football Club.

VFL/AFL players

 Terry Cahill –  
 Kevin Walsh –  
 Dean Bailey –  
 Peter Banfield – ,   
 Gary O’Donnell –   
 Paul Salmon – ,  
 Tim Livingstone –  
 Matthew Allan – ,  
 Nick Malceski – ,  
 David Wirrpanda – 
 Aiden Begg - Collingwood

References

External links
 Official Club website
 Official Eastern Football League website

Eastern Football League (Australia) clubs
Australian rules football clubs established in 1962
1962 establishments in Australia
Sport in the City of Maroondah
Ringwood, Victoria